The Chengdu Academy of Fine Arts is an art school, based in the Xindu District of Chengdu, Sichuan, China.

The academy is associated with the Sichuan Conservatory of Music and has its facilities located at the Xindu Campus. It offers bachelor's degrees and master's degrees.

Foundation
The Sichuan Fine Arts Institute (SCFAI) is located in Chongqing, but since 1997, Chongqing has been separate from the Sichuan province, and there was not an equivalent institute in Chengdu. One of the vice presidents of Sichuan Fine Arts Institute, Ma Yiping (马一平), organized some teachers from SCFAI to move to Chengdu and created the Chengdu Academy of Fine Arts in 2000, which is formally a school that belongs to the Sichuan Conservatory of Music.

See also
 Chengdu Art Academy
 Sichuan Conservatory of Music, Chengdu
 Sichuan Fine Arts Institute, Chongqing

References

External links
 Chengdu Academy of Fine Arts website

2000 establishments in China
Educational institutions established in 2000
Art schools in China
Academies of arts
Universities and colleges in Chengdu
Arts in Chengdu